Ulan Duży  is a village in the administrative district of Gmina Ulan-Majorat, within Radzyń Podlaski County, Lublin Voivodeship, in eastern Poland.

References

Villages in Radzyń Podlaski County
Lublin Voivodeship (1474–1795)
Siedlce Governorate
Lublin Governorate
Lublin Voivodeship (1919–1939)